Apartment Hunting is a 2001 album by Mary Margaret O'Hara, composed and released as a soundtrack album for the 2000 film Apartment Hunting.

Guest musicians appearing on the album include Klave y Kongo and Rusty McCarthy.

Track listing

Personnel
 Mary Margaret O'Hara – vocals
 Michael White – trumpet
 Phil Dwyer – clarinet, saxophone
 Matt Horner – piano, keyboards
 Dennis Keldie – accordion
 Chip Yearwood – guitar
 Rusty McCarthy – guitar
 Louis Simao – bass
 Russ Boswell – bass
 Mike Sloski – drums
 Celina Carroll – percussion, vocals
 Bill Robertson – vocals, acoustic guitar

Mary Margaret O'Hara albums
2001 soundtrack albums